A taxonomic system, the Bentham & Hooker system for seed plants, was published in Bentham and Hooker's Genera plantarum ad exemplaria imprimis in herbariis kewensibus servata definita in three volumes between 1862 and 1883.

George Bentham (1800–1884) and Joseph Dalton Hooker (1817–1911) were British botanists who were closely affiliated to the Royal Botanic Gardens, Kew, in England. Their system of botanical taxonomy was based on the principle of natural affinities and is considered as pre-Darwinian as it does not take evolution into account. The Genera plantarum classified an estimated 97,205 species into 202 families and 7,569 genera.

Summary 
The system recognises the following main groups:
 Class DICOTYLEDONES
DICOTYLEDONUM POLYPETALE vol I
 Series 1. Thalamiflorae
 Series 2. Disciflorae
 Series 3. Calyciflorae
DICOTYLEDONES GAMOPETALÆ vol II
 Series 1. Inferae
 Series 2. Heteromerae
 Series 3. Bicarpellatae
DICOTYLEDONES MONOCHLAMIDEÆ vol III
 Class GYMNOSPERMEÆ vol III (1)
 Class MONOCOTYLEDONES vol III (2)

Families and orders in the Bentham & Hooker system 
Note that this system was published well before there were internationally accepted rules for botanical nomenclature.  It indicates a family by "ordo"; an order is indicated by "cohors" (in the first two volumes) or "series" (in the third volume); in the first two volumes “series” refers to a rank above that of order.  Terminations for families are not what they are now.  Neither of these phenomena is a problem from a nomenclatural perspective:  the ICBN provides for this

Dicotyledonae 
Dicotyledonae 
DICOTYLEDONUM POLYPETALARUM Vol I
 SERIES I THALAMIFLORÆ
 COHORS I. RANALES
 I. RANUNCULACEÆ
 II. DILLENIACEAE
 III. CALYCANTHACEÆ
 IV. MAGNOLIACEAE
 V. ANONACEAE [sic]
 VI. MENISPERMACEÆ
 VII. BERBERIDACEÆ
 VIII. NYMPHÆACEAE
 COHORS II. PARIETALES
 IX. SARRACENIACEAE
 X. PAPAVERACEAE
 XI. CRUCIFERAE
 XII. CAPPARIDEAE
 XIII. RESEDACEAE
 XIV. CISTINEAE
 XV. VIOLARIEAE p. 114 4 tribes
 XVI. CANELLACEAE
 XVII. BIXINEAE
 COHORS III. POLYGALINÆ
 XVIII. PITTOSPOREÆ
 XIX. TREMANDREAE
 XX. POLYGALAE
 XXa. VOCHYSIACEAE
 COHORS IV. CARYOPHYLLINÆ
 XXI. FRANKENIACEÆ
 XXII. CARYOPHYLLEÆ
 XXIII. PORTULACEÆ
 XIV. TAMARISCINEÆ
 COHORS V. GUTTIFERALES
 XXV. ELATINEÆ
 XXVI. HYPERICINEÆ
 XXVII. GUTTIFERÆ
 XXVIII. TERNSTROEMIACEÆ
 XXIX. DIPTEROCARPEÆ
 XXX. CHLENACEÆ
 COHORS VI. MALVALES
 XXXI. MALVACEÆ
 XXXII. STERCULIACEÆ
 XXXIII. TILIACEÆ
 SERIES II. DISCIFLORÆ
 COHORS VII. GERANIALES
 XXXIV LINEÆ
 XXXV. HUMIRIACEÆ
 XXXVI. MALPIGHIACEÆ
 XXXVII. ZYGOPHYLLEÆ
 XXXVIII. GERANIACEÆ
 XXXIX. RUTACEÆ
 XL. SIMARUBEÆ [sic]
 XLI. OCHNACEÆ
 XLII. BURSERACEÆ
 XLIII. MELIACEÆ
 XLIV. CHAILLETIACEÆ
 COHORS VIII. OLACALES
 XLV. OLACINEÆ
 XLVI. ILICINEÆ
 COHORS IX. CELASTRALES
 XLVII. CELASTRINEÆ
 LVII. LEGUMINOSÆ
 LVIII. ROSACEÆ
 LIX. SAXIFRAGEÆ
 LX. CRASSULACEÆ
 LXI. DROSERACEÆ
 LXII. HAMAMELIDEÆ
 LXIII. BRUNIACEÆ
 LXIV. HALORAGEÆ
 COHORS XII. MYRTALES
 LXV. RHIZOPHOREÆ
 LXVI. COMBRETACEÆ
 LXVII. MYRTACEÆ
 LXVIII. MELASTOMACEÆ
 LXIX. LYTHRARIEÆ
 LXX. ONAGRARIEÆ
 COHORS XIII. PASSIFLORALES
 LXXI. SAMYDACEÆ
 LXXII. LOASEÆ
 LXXIII. TURNERACEÆ
 LXXIV. PASSIFLOREÆ
 LXXV. CUCURBITACEÆ
 LXXVI. BEGONIACEÆ
 LXXVII. DATISCEÆ
 COHORS XIV. FICOIDALES
 LXXVIII. CACTEÆ
 LXXIX. FICIOIDEÆ
 COHORS XV. UMBELLALES
 LXXX. UMBELLIFERÆ
 LXXXI. ARALIACEÆ
 LXXXII. CORNACEÆ
DICOTYLEDONES GAMOPETALÆ vol II
 SERIES I. INFERÆ
 COHORS I. RUBIALES
 LXXXIII. CAPRIFOLIACEÆ
 LXXXIV. RUBIACEÆ
 COHORS II. ASTERALES
 LXXXV. VALERIANEÆ
 LXXXVI. DIPSACEÆ
 LXXXVII. CALCEREÆ
 LXXXVIII. COMPOSITÆ
 COHORS III. CAMPANALES
 LXXXIX. STYLIDIEÆ
 LC. GOODENOVIEÆ
 XCI. CAMPANULACEÆ
 SERIES II. HETEROMERÆ
 COHORS IV ERICALES
 XCII. VACCINIACEÆ
 XCIII. ERICACEÆ
 XCIV. MONOTROPEÆ
 XCV. EPACRIDEÆ
 XCVI. DIAPENSIACEÆ
 XCVII. LENNOACEÆ
 COHORS V. PRIMULALES
 XCVIII. PLUMBAGINEÆ
 XCIX. PRIMULACEÆ
 C. MYRSINEÆ
 COHORS VI. EBENALES
 CI. SAPOTACEÆ
 CII. EBENACEÆ
 CIII. STYRACEÆ
 SERIES III. BICARPELLATÆ
 COHORS VII. GENTIANALES
 CIV. OLEACEÆ
 CV. SALVADORACEÆ
 CVI. APOCYNACEÆ
 CVII. ASCLEPIADEÆ
 CVIII. LOGANIACEÆ
 CIX. GENTIANEÆ
 COHORS VIII. POLEMONIALES
 CX. POLEMONIACEÆ
 CXI. HYDROPHYLLACEÆ
 CXII. BORAGINEÆ
 CXIII. CONVOLVULACEÆ
 CXIV. SOLANACEÆ
 COHORS IX. PERSONALES
 CXV. SCROPHULARINEÆ
 CXVI. OROBRANCHACEÆ
 CXVII. LENTIBULARIEÆ
 CXVIII. COLUMELLIACEÆ
 CXIX. GESNERACEÆ [sic]
 CXX. BIGNONIACEÆ
 CXXI. PEDALINEÆ
 CXXII. ACANTHACEÆ
 COHORS X. LAMIALES
 CXXIII. MYOPORINEÆ
 CXXIV. SELAGINEÆ
 CXXV. VERBENACEÆ
 CXXVI. LABIATÆ
 incertae sedis
 CXXVII. PLANTAGINEÆ
DICOTYLEDONES MONOCHLAMIDEÆ vol III
 Series I. Curvembryeæ
 CXXVIII. NYCTAGINEÆ
 CXXIX. ILLECEBRACEÆ
 CXXX. AMARANTACEÆ [sic]
 CXXXI. CHENOPODIACEÆ
 CXXXII. PHYTOLACCACEÆ
 CXXXIII. BATIDEÆ
 CXXXIV. POLYGONACEÆ
 Series II. Multiovulatæ Aquaticæ
 CXXXV. PODOSTEMONACEÆ
 Series III. Multiovulatæ Terrestres
 CXXXVI. NEPENTHACEÆ
 CXXXVII. CYTINACEÆ
 CXXXVIII. ARISTOLOCHIACEÆ
 Series IV. Microembryeæ
 CXXXIX. PIPERACEÆ
 CXL. CHLORANTACEÆ
 CXLI. MYRISTICEÆ
 CXLII. MONIMIACEÆ
 Series V. Daphnales
 CXLIII. LAURINEÆ
 CXLIV. PROTEACEÆ
 CXLV. THYMELÆACEÆ
 CXLVI. PENÆACEÆ
 CXLVII. ELÆAGNACEÆ
 Series VI. Achlamydosporeæ
 CXLVIII. LORANTHACEÆ
 CXLIX. SANTALACEÆ
 CL. BALANOPHOREÆ
 Series VII. Unisexuales
 CLI. EUPHORBIACEÆ
 CLII. BALANOPEÆ
 CLIII. URTICACEÆ
 CLIV. PLATANACEÆ
 CLV. LEITNERIEÆ
 CLVI. JUGLANDEÆ
 CLVII. MYRICACEÆ
 CLVIII. CASUARINEÆ
 CLIX. CUPULIFERÆ
 Series VIII. Ordines anomali (incertae sedis)
 CLX. SALICINEÆ
 CLXI. LACISTEMACEÆ
 CLXII. EMPETRACEÆ
 CLXIII. CERATOPHYLLEÆ
GYMNOSPERMEÆ'' [sic] vol III (1)
 CLXIV. GNETACEÆ
 CLXV. CONIFERÆ
 CLXVI. CYCADACEÆ

 Gymnosperms 
 vol III (1)

 Monocotyledons MonocotyledonsSummary pp viii–xiMONOCOTYLEDONES''' vol III (2) p. 448

Series I. Microspermæ p. 448 
 CLXVII. HYDROCHARIDEÆp. 448
 CLXVIII. BURMANNIACEÆ
 CLXIX. ORCHIDEÆ p. 460

Series II Epigynæ p. 636 
 CLXX. SCITAMINEÆ p. 636
 CLXXI. BROMELIACEÆ p. 657
 CLXXII. HAEMODORACEÆ p. 671
 CLXXIII. IIRIDEÆ p. 681 3 tribes
 CLXXIV. AMARYLLIDEÆ p. 711 5 tribes 
 I Tribus Hypoxideae p. 716
 II Tribus Amarylleae p. 718 3 subtribes
 III Tribus Alstroemerieae p. 735 
 IV Tribus Agaveae p. 737
 V Tribus Vellosieae p. 739
 CLXXV. TACCACEÆ p. 740
 CLXXVI. DIOSCOREACEÆ p. 741

Series III Coronarieæ p. 746 
 CLXXVII. ROXBURGHIACEÆ p. 746
 CLXXVIII. LILIACEÆ p. 748 (20 tribes) Schema 748–763
 Tribus I Smilaceae p. 763
 Tribus II Asparageae p. 764 
 Tribus III Luzuriageae
 Tribus IV Polygonateae p. 768
 Tribus V Convallariae
 Tribus VI Aspidistreae
 Tribus VII Hemerocalleae
 Tribus VIII Aloineae
...
 Tribus X Asphodeleae p. 781 5 subtribes
 Tribus XI Johnsonieae p. 795
 Tribus XII Allieae p. 798 Schema p. 750 4 subtribes 
 Subtribus I Agapantheae p. 798
 Subtribus II Euallieae p. 798
 Subtribus III Gilliesieae p. 804
 Subtribus IV Massonieae p. 806
 Tribus XIII Scilleae p. 807
 Tribus XIV Tulipeae p. 816
 Tribus XV Colchiceae
...
 Tribus XX Veratreae p. 834
 CLXXIX. PONTEDERIACEÆ p. 836
 CLXXX. PHILYDRACEÆ p. 840
 CLXXXI. XYRIDEÆ p. 841
 CLXXXII. MAYACEÆ p. 843
 CLXXXIII. COMMELINACEÆ p. 844
 CLXXXIV. RAPATEACEÆ p. 857

Series VI Calycineæ p. 860 
 CLXXXV. FLAGELLARIEÆ
 CLXXXVI. JUNCACEÆ
 CLXXXVII. PALMÆ

Series V. Nudifloreæ p. 949 
 CLXXXVIII. PANDANEÆ
 CLXXXIX. CYCLANTHACEÆ
 CXC TYPHACEÆ
 CXCI. AROIDEÆ
 CXCII. LEMNACEÆ p. 1000

Series VI. Apocarpæ p.1001 
 CXCIII. TRIURIDEÆ
 CXCIV. ALISMACEÆ p. 1003
 CXCV. NAIADACEÆ [sic]

Series VII. Glumaceæ p. 1019 
 CXCVI. ERIOCAULEÆ
 CXCVII. CENTROLEPIDEÆ p. 1025
 CXCVIII. RESTIACEÆ
 CXCIX. CYPERACEÆ
 CC. GRAMINEÆ

See also
Gamopetalae
Heteromerae
Monochlamydeae

References

Bibliography 

 
 1 Part 1 Index p.441
 
 

system, Bentham and Hooker